During the 1992–93 season, SV Werder Bremen played in the Bundesliga, the highest tier of the German football league system.

Season summary
Although Werder Bremen failed to retain the Cup Winner's Cup, they more than made up for it by winning the Bundesliga for the first time since 1988.

Players

First team squad
Squad at end of season

Left club during season

Reserve squad

References

Notes

External links

SV Werder Bremen seasons
SV Werder Bremen
German football championship-winning seasons